Funtrip Records is a Canadian independent record label founded  by musician Marc Costanzo. His band Len recorded an EP and two albums, Superstar (1994) and Get Your Legs Broke (1996) with Funtrip, which were co-released by Halifax-based No Records in the early 1990s, and later re-released in partnership with the company's distribution arm No Distribution after Len's major label success in 2001.

The company also "managed" other Canadian indie acts such as Buck 65, Sixtoo, Hip Club Groove and Cheklove. Costanzo also has another record company called Four Ways To Rock.

See also
 List of record labels

References

Canadian independent record labels
Indie rock record labels
Pop record labels